Melsik Baghdasaryan (born January 28, 1992) is an Armenian mixed martial artist, kickboxer and boxer, currently competing as a featherweight in the UFC. A professional competitor since 2013, he is the former Wu Lin Feng International champion, and one-time K-1 Welterweight title challenger.

Kickboxing career

Early career
Baghdasaryan began training karate at six years old, before transitioning to kickboxing, and later, muay thai. He has spent most of his professional career at the Glendale Fighting Club.

Baghdasaryan was scheduled to fight Jermaine Soto at a GLORY event on September 28, 2013. He won the fight by unanimous decision.

Baghdasaryan fought during the WCK vs. Wulinfeng event in 2013, with his opponent being Xie Chuang. Baghdasaryan won the fight by a unanimous decision, while suffering a slight injury to his left thumb.

Baghdasaryan was scheduled to fight John Vargas at WCK Muay Thai: Matter of Pride, on February 15, 2014. He won the fight by a third-round TKO.

In 2014 he once again under WCK Muay Thai, facing Chen Wei Chao. Melsik won the fight by a unanimous decision.

His kickboxing winning streak earned him a chance to fight for the Wu Lin Feng International title, held at the time by Qiu Jianliang. Baghdasaryan continued his winning streak with a majority decision win over the reigning champion.

Return to kickboxing
In his return to kickboxing, Baghdasaryan participated in the Wu Lin Feng 67 kg tournament, but lost in the quarter final round to Lu Jianbo, by a first-round KO. He bounced back with a decision wins over Wei Ninghui.

In 2017 Melsik took part in the K-1 Welterweight Grand Prix. He won a unanimous decision over Kazuki Yamagiwa in the quarter final bout, but an injury prevented him from taking further part in the tournament, and he was subsequently replaced by Yamagiwa.

His next fight with K-1 was against Yuta Kubo, winner of the 2017 Welterweight Grand Prix, for the K-1 Welterweight title. Kubo won the fight by a unanimous decision.

Boxing career
After winning the WLF title, Melsik transitioned to boxing in 2015. He has had three professional fights to date. In his boxing debut he faced Mario Angeles. Angelas was unable to figure out how to fight against a southpaw and lost the fight in the third round, after a right to the body which forced the referee to stop the fight.

In his second boxing match, Melsik fought Abraham Calderon Ruiz, winning the fight through a unanimous decision. He then fought Diego Padilla, and won the match by a majority decision.

Mixed martial arts career

Early career
After he suffered a submission loss in his MMA debut in 2014, Melsik would wait until 2019 for his second MMA bout. Baghdasaryan amassed a four fight knockout winning streak, with a cumulative fight time of 62 seconds. In the last of those four fights, against Art Hernandez, he made his lightweight debut.

Baghdasaryan was given a chance to fight for a UFC contract at Dana White's Contender Series 31, when he faced Dennis Buzukja. He won the fight by a unanimous decision, but was not given a contract.

Ultimate Fighting Championship
In March 2021, Baghdasaryan signed with the UFC.

Baghdasaryan made his promotional debut against Collin Anglin at UFC on ESPN 28 on July 31, 2021. He won the fight via knockout in round two.  This fight earned him the Performance of the Night award.

Baghdasaryan was scheduled to face T.J. Laramie November 6, 2021 at UFC 268. However, Laramie was forced to pull out due to diagnosed with MRSA. He was replaced by LFA Featherweight Champion Bruno Souza in his promotional debut.  At the weigh-ins, Souza weighed in at 148.4 pounds, 2.4 pounds over the featherweight non-title fight limit. The bout proceeded at a catchweight and he forfeited 20% of his purse to Baghdasaryan. He won the bout via unanimous decision.

Baghdasaryan was scheduled to face T.J. Laramie on April 16, 2022, at UFC Fight Night 206. However, Melsik pulled out due to unknown reasons.

Baghdasaryan was expected to face Joanderson Brito on October 15, 2022, at UFC Fight Night 212. However, Baghdasaryan pulled out in late September due to a broken hand.

Baghdasaryan faced Joshua Culibao on February 12, 2023, at UFC 284. He lost the fight via a rear-naked choke submission in the second round.

Championships and accomplishments

Mixed martial arts
 Ultimate Fighting Championship
 Performance of the Night (One time)

Kickboxing
Wu Lin Feng
WLF 67 kg International Championship

Mixed martial arts record
 

|-
|Loss
|align=center|7–2
|Joshua Culibao
|Submission (rear-naked choke)
|UFC 284
|
|align=center|2
|align=center|2:02
|Perth, Australia 
|
|-
|Win
|align=center|7–1
|Bruno Souza
|Decision (unanimous)
|UFC 268
|
|align=center|3
|align=center|5:00
|New York City, New York, United States
|
|-
|Win
|align=center|6–1
|Collin Anglin
|TKO (head kick and punches)
|UFC on ESPN: Hall vs. Strickland
|
|align=center|2
|align=center|1:50
|Las Vegas, Nevada, United States
|
|-
|Win
|align=center|5–1
|Dennis Buzukja
|Decision (unanimous)
|Dana White's Contender Series 31
|
|align=center|3
|align=center|5:00
|Las Vegas, Nevada, United States
|
|-
|Win
|align=center|4–1
|Art Hernandez
|KO (punch)
|Lights Out Xtreme Fighting 3
|
|align=center|1
|align=center|0:07
|Commerce, California, United States
|
|-
|Win
|align=center|3–1
|Jay White
|TKO (punches)
|Gladiator Challenge: Berry vs. Baseman
|
|align=center|1
|align=center|0:09
|San Jacinto, California, United States
|
|-
|Win
|align=center|2–1
|Mauricio Diaz
|TKO (punches)
|Lights Out Xtreme Fighting 1
|
|align=center|1
|align=center|0:32
|Burbank, California, United States
|
|-
|Win
|align=center|1–1
|Jason Gouvion
|TKO (punches)
|Gladiator Challenge
|
|align=center|1
|align=center|0:14
|Whitney, California, United States
|
|-
|Loss
|align=center|0–1
|Jay Bogan
|Submission (armbar)
|LOP: Chaos at the Casino 4
|
|align=center|1
|align=center|1:26
|Inglewood, California, United States
|
|-

Kickboxing record

|-  style="background:#fbb;"
| March 31, 2018|| Loss ||align=left| Yuta Kubo || K-1 World GP 2018: K'FESTA.1 || Saitama, Japan || Decision (Unanimous) || 3 || 3:00 
|-
! style=background:white colspan=9 |
|-  style="background:#cfc;"
| September 9, 2017|| Win ||align=left| Kazuki Yamigawa || K-1 World GP 2017 Welterweight Championship Tournament, Quarter Finals || Saitama, Japan || Decision (Unanimous) || 3 || 3:00
|-  style="background:#cfc;"
| November 17, 2016|| Win ||align=left| Wei Ninghui || Wu Lin Feng 2016: China vs USA || Las Vegas, United States  || Decision (Unanimous) || 3 || 3:00
|-  style="background:#fbb;"
| January 23, 2016|| Loss ||align=left| Lu Jianbo || Wu Lin Feng 2016: World Kickboxing Championship in Shanghai || Shanghai, China || KO (Straight Right) || 1 ||
|-  style="background:#cfc;"
| November 1, 2014|| Win ||align=left| Qiu Jianliang || Wu Lin Feng & WCK Muaythai: China vs USA || Las Vegas, United States  || Decision (Majority) || 3 || 3:00 
|-
! style=background:white colspan=9 |
|-  style="background:#cfc;"
| June 9, 2014|| Win ||align=left| Chen Wei Chao || WCK Muay Thai: International Showdown || Temecula, California, United States  || Decision (Split) || 3 || 3:00
|-  style="background:#cfc;"
| February 15, 2014|| Win ||align=left| John Vargas || WCK Muay Thai: Matter of Pride || Temecula, California, United States  || TKO || 3 ||
|-  style="background:#cfc;"
| November 2, 2013|| Win ||align=left| Xie Chuang || WCK vs. Wulinfeng 2013 || Las Vegas, United States  || Decision (Unanimous) || 3 || 3:00
|-  style="background:#cfc;"
| September 28, 2013 || Win ||align=left| Jermaine Soto  || Road to GLORY || Ontario, California, United States || Decision (Unanimous) || 3 || 3:00
|-
| colspan=9 | Legend:

Professional boxing record

See also
 List of male mixed martial artists
 List of male kickboxers

References

External links
 Melsik Baghdasaryan K-1 profile.
 UFC.COM - https://www.ufc.com/athlete/melsik-baghdasaryan
 Instagram - https://instagram.com/melsik_baghdasaryan?igshid=YmMyMTA2M2Y=
 Telegram - https://t.me/melsik_thegun
 Twitter - https://mobile.twitter.com/melsik_the_gun

Living people
Armenian male kickboxers
1992 births
Featherweight kickboxers
Armenian male mixed martial artists
Mixed martial artists utilizing boxing
Mixed martial artists utilizing Muay Thai
Mixed martial artists utilizing kickboxing
Armenian Muay Thai practitioners
Armenian male boxers
Sportspeople from Yerevan
Sportspeople from Glendale, California
Ultimate Fighting Championship male fighters